Bouvardia elegans is a species of flowering plant in the family Rubiaceae. It is found in Mexico.

References

External links 

 Bouvardia elegans at The Plant List
 Bouvardia elegans at Tropicos

Plants described in 2011
Spermacoceae
Flora of Mexico